Louis (Louie) Psihoyos (born April 15, 1957) is an American photographer and documentary film director known for his still photography and contributions to National Geographic. Psihoyos, a certified SCUBA diver, has become increasingly concerned with bringing awareness to underwater life. In 2009, he directed and appeared in the feature-length documentary The Cove, which won an Oscar for Best Documentary Feature.

Early life and career
Psihoyos was born in Dubuque, Iowa in 1957, the son of a Greek immigrant who left the Peloponnesos region after World War II. Psihoyos took an interest in photography at the age of fourteen. As a teenager, he worked as a photo intern with the Telegraph Herald newspaper. During that time he also worked as an extra on the set of the 1978 film F.I.S.T.

Psihoyos attended the University of Missouri, majoring in photojournalism. In 1980, at the age of 23, he was hired by National Geographic and remained with the magazine for seventeen years. During this time he married and had two children. He received multiple awards for his photography, including first place in the World Press Contest and the Hearst Award. He has worked with magazines such as Smithsonian, Discover, GEO, Time, Newsweek, The New York Times Magazine, New York, Sports Illustrated, and Rock & Ice.

Psihoyos wrote and photographed the book Hunting Dinosaurs with friend and collaborator John Knoebber.  It was published in 1994.

Later work and films
Psihoyos co-founded the non-profit organization Oceanic Preservation Society in 2005. The objective of the organization is to educate the public on what is happening to the Earth's oceans and to encourage individuals to make a difference so that future generations will have an enriched environment instead of a diminishing one.

The Cove

Together with Ric O'Barry, Jim Clark, and a crew, Psihoyos filmed the feature-length documentary The Cove. Released in 2009, the film examines the yearly killing of dolphins in Taiji, Wakayama, Japan. Unable to acquire permission from the Japanese government, the filmmakers were required to go to extreme lengths in order to obtain their footage, utilizing equipment and tactics never previously used in a documentary film. The film also features the International Whaling Commission (IWC) and IWC's refusal to protect small cetaceans, such as dolphins, primarily due to Japan's influence on the commission. Furthermore, The Cove highlights the risk of mercury poisoning to humans who consume dolphin meat while documenting a Japanese government program to distribute dolphin meat to Japanese school children. The meat that is not distributed is sold and listed as whale meat. On March 7, 2010, The Cove won the Academy Award for Best Documentary Feature at the 82nd Academy Awards..."  As well as its Oscar win, The Cove was nominated for awards at multiple festivals including Hot Docs, Sundance Film Festival, Toronto Film Festival, Sheffield Doc/Fest. and Crested Butte Film Festival.

Racing Extinction

Racing Extinction is a 2015 film by Psihoyos about the ongoing Anthropogenic mass extinction of species and the efforts by scientists, activists and journalists to document it. In the documentary the slaughter of sea life around the world is brought to the viewer's attention. Racing Extinction addresses two major causes of species extinction: climate change and the wildlife trade. Marine species are featured prominently for both, from tiny organisms whose shells are dissolving as a result of acidifying ocean water, to large whale sharks caught for their fins, meat and oil. Psihoyos, along with the help from activists, Tesla Motors, and Travis Threlkel, projected images depicting the endangerment of the planet onto buildings in New York City. The film was the winner of the 2016 Cinema for Peace International Green Film Award.

The Game Changers

The Game Changers is a 2018 documentary film about the benefits of plant-based diets for athletes.

Mission: Joy
Mission: Joy is a 2021 documentary that explores the special friendship between Archbishop Desmond Tutu and the Dalai Lama. Although they are opposites in many ways, their playful friendship shows us that our shared humanity is bigger than our differences. Their life stories remind us that joy is an inside job, that joy and pain are inseparable, and that deep connection is one of the secrets to joy.

Joe Rogan
Psihoyos appeared on the Powerful JRE podcast on November 18, 2019.

References

External links

"The Cove"
Oceanic Preservation Society
International Whaling Commission
Interview by Heso Magazine
Interview by Momentum Blog

1957 births
People from Dubuque, Iowa
University of Missouri alumni
National Geographic Society
American photographers
Living people
American people of Greek descent
Directors of Best Documentary Feature Academy Award winners
Directors Guild of America Award winners
American documentary filmmakers